Banks is an English surname. Notable people and fictional characters with the surname include:

Sports
Adrian Banks (born 1986), American basketball player
Alan Banks (rugby league) (born c. 1965), rugby league footballer of the 1980s and 1990s
Antonio Banks (American football) (born 1973), defensive back
Montel Vontavious Porter (born 1973), American wrestler also known as Antonio Banks
Brad Banks (born 1980), American football player
Carl Banks (born 1962), American football player
Chip Banks (born 1959), American football player
Denis Banks (born 1959), Australian rules footballer
Eric Banks (American football) (born 1998), American football player
Ernie Banks (1931–2015), American baseball player
Gordon Banks (1937–2019), English football goalkeeper
Henry Banks (1914–1994), American racing driver
James Banks III (born 1998), American basketball player
Johnathon Banks (born 1982), American boxer
Kenny Banks (1923–1994), English footballer
Maud Banks (born 1879 – n.d.), American tennis player
Marcus Banks (born 1981), American basketball player
M. B. Banks (1883–1970), American football and basketball player and football, basketball and baseball coach
Omari Banks (born 1982), West Indian cricketer
Percy Banks (1885–1915), English cricketer
Sasha Banks (born 1992), stage/ring name for professional wrestler Mercedes Kaestner-Varnado
Sean Banks (born 1985), American basketball player
Sevyn Banks (born 1999), American football player
Sonny Banks (1940–1965), American boxer
Steve Banks (born 1972), English football goalkeeper
Tavian Banks (born 1974), American footballer
Tom Banks (born 1948), American footballer
Tommy Banks (born 1929), English footballer (Bolton Wanderers) 
Tony Banks (born 1973), American football quarterback
Vic Banks (1889–1972), rugby league footballer from New Zealander of the 1910s
Willie Banks (born 1956), American track athlete
Willie Banks (born 1969), American baseball player
Zach Banks (born 1997), American race car driver

Politics
Dennis Banks (1932–2017), Native American activist and writer
Gladys E. Banks (1897–1972), New York politician
Gordon Banks (born 1955), British politician
Hal C. Banks (1909–1985), Canadian labour leader
 Jim Banks (born 1979), American Congressman representing Indiana
John Banks (born 1946), Mayor of Auckland, New Zealand
J. B. Banks (1924–2003), American politician
Nathaniel P. Banks (1816–1894), American politician and Union General during the American Civil War
Rosemary Banks (born 1951), New Zealand's ambassador to France
Tommy Banks (1936–2018), Canadian musician and politician
Tony Banks, Baron Stratford (1943–2006), British Labour politician
Victor Banks (born 1947), Anguillan politician

Arts and entertainment

Writing
Carolyn Banks, American novelist
Catherine Banks, Canadian playwright
Chris Banks (poet), Canadian poet
Enoch Marvin Banks (1877-1911), American historian and educator
George Linnaeus Banks, British writer
Iain Banks (1954–2013), Scottish novelist
Isabella Varley Banks, British novelist (married to George Linnaeus Banks)
Leslie Esdaile Banks, American novelist
Mary Ross Banks (1846–1910), American litterateur and author
Michael A. Banks, American science fiction writer
Russell Banks (1940-2023), American novelist

Music
Aidan Banks, bass guitarist
Ant Banks, rapper
Azealia Banks, American singer/rapper
Bankie Banx (b. Clement Ashley Banks), Anguillan musician
Bessie Banks, American soul singer
Chico Banks (1962–2008), American Chicago blues guitarist and singer
Durk Banks, American rapper and singer known professionally as Lil Durk
Erica Banks, American rapper
Jillian Banks, American singer, and songwriter known as Banks
Larry Banks, American soul singer, songwriter and record producer
Lloyd Banks, American rapper
L.V. Banks (1932–2011), American blues guitarist, singer and songwriter
Mike Banks (musician), techno musician
Ms Banks, British rapper
Nick Banks, British drummer and businessman
Paul Banks (American musician), English-American singer and guitarist (Interpol)
Paul Banks (English musician), British songwriter and guitarist (Shed Seven, The Rising and Albion)
Peter Banks (1947–2013), English guitarist
Tony Banks (musician) (born 1950), British songwriter and keyboardist (Genesis)

Film
Briana Banks, American pornographic actress
Elizabeth Banks, American actress
Jonathan Banks (born 1947), American actor
Leslie Banks, British actor and director
Lionel Banks, cinematic art director
Monty Banks (1887–1950), comedian and film director
Morwenna Banks, British actress and comedian
Robert Banks (filmmaker) (Robert C. Banks Jr.) (born 1966), American filmmaker
Steven Banks, American comedian, actor and screenwriter

Other
Darryl Banks, comics artist
Doug Banks, American radio personality
Lesley Banks, British artist
Michele Banks, artist
Nancy Banks-Smith, British television critic
Robin Banks, radio DJ and TV presenter in the UK
Thomas Banks (1735–1805), English sculptor
Timothy Banks, American illustrator
Violet Banks (1896–1985), Scottish artist

Science and technology
Edgar James Banks (1866–1945), American archeologist
Edward Banks (naturalist) (1903–1988), British naturalist and museum curator
Francis Rodwell Banks (1898–1985), British engineer and fuel specialist
Harlan Parker Banks (1913–1998), American paleobotanist
James Arthur Banks (1897–1967), British civil engineer
Sir Joseph Banks (1743–1820), English naturalist
Karen Banks, computer networking expert
Nathan Banks (1868–1953), American entomologist
Richard C. Banks (born 1931), American ornithologist
Robert Banks (chemist) (1921–1989), American research chemist
Tom Banks (physicist) (born 1949), American physicist

Other
Aaron Banks (disambiguation), multiple people
David Banks (disambiguation), multiple people
Edward Banks (disambiguation), multiple people
George Banks, American convicted murderer
Laurence H. Banks (1897–1972), American politician
Mary MacLeod Banks (1861–1951), folklorist
Mateo Banks, Argentine spree killer
Sir Maurice Banks (1901–1991), British businessman
Mike Banks (mountaineer) (1922–2013), British mountain climber
Nathaniel P. Banks, American Civil War Union general
Ridgway Banks, American inventor
Tom Banks (disambiguation)
Tyra Banks (born 1973), American supermodel
William Mitchell Banks (1842–1904), Scottish surgeon

Fictional characters
Adam Banks, in the film The Mighty Ducks
Inspector Alan Banks, in the crime novels of Peter Robinson
Charlie Banks (One Life to Live), from the American soap opera One Life to Live
Clifford Banks, in the TV series Murder One
Rosie M. Banks, a recurring character in stories by author P. G. Wodehouse
Alfie Banks, the main protagonist of the graphic adventure game A Golden Wake.
Tom Banks (EastEnders), from the British soap opera EastEnders
Jared Banks, from One Life to Live
Joe Banks, title character of the film Joe Versus the Volcano, played by Tom Hanks
Natalie Banks, from One Life to Live
Victoria Lord Banks, fictional character form One Life to Live
Banks, a family on the television series The Fresh Prince of Bel-Air
The Banks family in Mary Poppins (book series), children's books by P. L. Travers, and the film and musical based upon them

See also
 Bank (surname)
 Banksia (disambiguation)

English-language surnames